Alessa Records (initiated 2004 in Hagenberg, Austria) is a record label mainly releasing in the genre jazz and jazzrock.

Background 
After more than 25 years of experience in the music business Peter Guschelbauer decided to start a record label with music of the highest quality. The name is derived from the nickname of his daughter Alexandra, who was one and a half year at the time of foundation. After discovering Jimi Hendrix in the late 1960s, Guschelbauer trans directed towards John Coltrane and the jazz. The fusion of jazz and rock became close to his heart the record label reflect this interest. Guschelbauer operates a recording studio in Hagenberg, some labels, publishing and distribution. Another centerpiece of the company is the event equipment, are being cared for primarily cultural festivals such as the Inntöne Jazz Festival, Gmunden Festival, Jazz Festival Steyr, STIWA Jazz Forum in Hagenberg, Tuesday the Bluesday in the Linz Labour, open the town hall square airs in Leonding.

Discography 
Albums (in selection)

References

External links 

Record labels established in 2004
Austrian record labels